BEST  is the second compilation Japanese album by South Korean girl group After School released on March 18, 2015 under Avex Trax. The album contains all of After School's Japanese singles. The limited edition comes in 2 versions with a DVD featuring After School 2nd Japan Tour Dress To Shine and also a DVD featuring all of After School's Japanese music videos up to 2014. The regular edition comes in CD-only version.

Track listing

Release history

References

After School (band) albums
Avex Group compilation albums
2015 compilation albums
Hybe Corporation albums